The 2015–16 Nebraska Cornhuskers men's basketball team represented the University of Nebraska in the 2015–16 NCAA Division I men's basketball season. Led by head coach Tim Miles in his fourth season, the Cornhuskers played their home games at Pinnacle Bank Arena in downtown Lincoln, Nebraska and were members of the Big Ten Conference. They finished the season 16–18, 6–12 in Big Ten play to finish in 11th place. In the Big Ten tournament they defeated Rutgers and Wisconsin to advance to the quarterfinals where they lost to Maryland.

Previous season
The Cornhuskers finished the 2014–15 Season 13–18, 5–13 in Big Ten play to finish in twelfth place. They lost in the first round of the Big Ten tournament to Penn State.

Departures

Incoming transfers

Incoming Recruits

2016 Recruiting Class

Roster

Schedule

|-
!colspan=9 style=| Spanish exhibition tour

|-
!colspan=9 style=| Exhibition

|-
!colspan=9 style=| Non-conference regular season

|-
!colspan=9 style=|Big Ten regular season

|-
!colspan=9 style=|Big Ten tournament

References

Nebraska
Nebraska Cornhuskers men's basketball seasons
Corn
Corn